Maurizio Lauro (born 12 March 1981) is an Italian football coach and a former player who played as a left back, currently in charge of  club Alessandria.

Club career

Ascoli
Born in Ischia, Ischia island, Campania, Lauro started his professional career with Marche side Ascoli. After made two league appearances in two seasons for Ascoli's first team, Lauro became a full-member of the first team in 2000–01 season, but for Serie C2 club Chieti. Chieti won the promotion playoffs that season and promoted. On 1 July 2001, he returned to Ascoli Piceno and played six times in Serie C1. That season Ascoli finished as the Group B champion. Lauro then spent two Serie C2 seasons in San Marino. In 2004–05 season he returned to Ascoli and became one of the regular starter. He played 28 times that season and played once in promotion playoffs, as left back. In although losing to Torino in aggregate, Ascoli promoted to fill the vacancy due to Caso Genoa and the bankrupt of Torino and Perugia.

Lauro followed Ascoli promoted to Serie A, however, he left for fellow Serie A team Reggina on 31 August 2005. In January 2006, Reggina terminated his contract and Lauro returned to Ascoli as an understudy of left back Cristiano Del Grosso. The team finished as the tenth place that season. In July 2006, he was transferred to Serie B team Cesena for undisclosed fees.

Cesena
At Cesena, Lauro became a regular starter of the team, as left back and a centre-back (in first season). He missed two months from late September to October 2007 due to injury. He then returned to his old position – left back on 2 November against Lecce. That season Cesena finished as the bottom. He follow the team relegated to Lega Pro Prima Divisione in 2008 and promoted back to Serie B in 2009 as champion and promoted again to Serie A in 2010 as runner-up. In 2010–11 season, Cesena signed Yuto Nagatomo as left back, and Lauro played his second Serie A season, again as backup. After the team failed to win since round 3, Nagatomo was moved to right back to replace Luca Ceccarelli and Lauro became a starting left back again. In May 2011 he signed a new 2-year contract.

Ternana 
After a six-year playing career at Cesena, Lauro left the club for Serie B team Ternana Calcio on 16 July 2012.

International career
Lauro played once for Italy U16 in a friendly match.

Coaching career
The first club he coached was Castelfidardo in Serie D which he led to 6th place in their group in the 2020–21 season. On 26 June 2021, he was appointed manager of Serie C club Mantova. On 12 December 2021, he was fired by Mantova after the team won once in the last 7 games. He was successively reinstated as Mantova's head coach on 12 April 2022.

On 16 February 2023, Lauro was appointed new head coach of struggling Serie C club Alessandria until the end of the season.

Honours
Ascoli
Lega Pro Prima Divisione: 2002

Cesena
Lega Pro Prima Divisione: 2009

References

External links
 
 
 Cesena Profile
 FIGC National Team Archive 
 La Gazetta dello Sport Profile 
 La Gazetta dello Sport Profile (2007–08) 
 La Gazetta dello Sport Profile (2006–07) 

Italian footballers
Italy youth international footballers
Serie A players
Serie B players
Ascoli Calcio 1898 F.C. players
S.S. Chieti Calcio players
A.S.D. Victor San Marino players
Reggina 1914 players
A.C. Cesena players
Ternana Calcio players
Association football fullbacks
Sportspeople from the Province of Naples
1981 births
Living people
Footballers from Campania
Italian football managers
Mantova 1911 managers
U.S. Alessandria Calcio 1912 managers
Serie C managers